Cameron A. Morrison (1869–1953) was a U.S. senator from North Carolina from 1930 to 1932.

Senator Morrison may also refer to:

Dorilus Morrison (1814–1897), Minnesota State Senate
J. Blaine Morrison (died 1943), Maine State Senate
James L. D. Morrison (1816–1888), Illinois State Senate
Julie Morrison (born 1956), Illinois State Senate
Kathryn Morrison (politician) (1942–2013), Wisconsin State Senate
Sid Morrison (born 1933), Washington State Senate
Tommy Morrison (politician) (born 1975), Senate of Guam